Scopula fumosaria is a moth of the  family Geometridae. It is found in the Lake Baikal region.

Taxonomy
The name Scopula fumosaria is a junior secondary homonym of Emmiltis fumosaria, described by Robert Swinhoe in 1904 and requires a replacement name.

References

Moths described in 1913
fumosaria
Moths of Asia